Nam Cheong is a MTR interchange station located at ground level beneath West Kowloon Highway, in Sham Shui Po, Hong Kong opposite the Fu Cheong Estate. It is served by the Tung Chung and Tuen Ma lines and provides cross-platform interchange between platform 1 (Tuen Ma line towards Tuen Mun) and platform 4 (Tung Chung line towards Hong Kong). The livery of Nam Cheong station is pale yellow green.

Nam Cheong station was originally the southern terminus of the West Rail line before the opening of Kowloon Southern Link on 16 August 2009. The  passes between the tracks of the Tung Chung line without stopping at this station. A public transport interchange, located to the east of the station, allows for transfers to other modes of public transport. Architecture firm Aedas designed Nam Cheong station.

Although this station is on ground level, platform screen doors are fitted.

History 
Nam Cheong station was called Yen Chow Street station (after Yen Chow Street, a major thoroughfare in the area) in its planning stage. The station was subsequently renamed "Nam Cheong" after Nam Cheong Estate, a nearby public housing estate, which in turn is named after Nam Cheong Street (another thoroughfare). Nam Cheong Street was named after Mr. Chan Nam Cheong (陳南昌), a local philanthropist. As "Nam Cheong" is also the Cantonese-based transliteration for Nanchang, some sources mistakenly state that the station was named after the mainland Chinese city.

Works for Nam Cheong station started on 5 October 2000; the station was built by a joint venture formed by Balfour Beatty and Zen Pacific. The station was opened for public use on 16 December 2003, coinciding with the pre-opening charity trial run day of the KCR West Rail (later West Rail line), and the  part of the station started operation. On 20 December, the KCR West Rail officially commenced operation, and Nam Cheong became the southern terminus of the rail line.

Upon its completion, the station was a shared-use integrated station between MTR and KCR, and the first integrated one between the two systems. The station concourse was divided into two parts (managed by the two rail operators respectively). Special transfer turnstiles were located between the two parts, enabling passengers paying with Octopus card to interchange between the two systems by tapping their card just once.

The operations of MTR and KCR merged on 2 December 2007, and the management of the station unified under MTRCL. Following the network-wide fare zone merger of the former MTR and KCR networks on 28 September 2008, the transfer turnstiles along with the barriers separating the two fare zones were removed, and cross-platform interchange is now provided between platform 1 (Tuen Ma line towards ) and platform 4 (Tung Chung line towards ); several passageways were opened between the two platforms. One of the wider passages is aligned with the fifth and sixth carriages of the Hong Kong-bound trains on the Tung Chung line platform.

Nam Cheong lost its status as the southern terminus of West Rail line, and became an intermediate station for both Tung Chung and West Rail lines (Now Tuen Ma line).

Hence, Nam Cheong was included in the project and is now an intermediate station on the Tuen Ma line.

Station layout 

All four platforms are located at ground level. The platforms are curved because they were built around the existing tracks. However, the gaps are not very large.

Before the merging of fare systems on 28 September 2008, Octopus card users transferring between the West Rail line and Tung Chung line had to use the transfer gates separating fare areas the MTR and KCR systems. Once the card was placed on a reader, the first section of journey fare would be deducted and passengers could walk over to the other fare area. Passengers who accidentally walked to the wrong area by mistake had to exit the station through the exit gates (not the transfer gates) within 15 minutes, or an extra fare was charged.

Entrances and exits 

 A1: V Walk, Fu Cheong Estate 
 A2: V Walk
 B: Cheung Sha Wan Wholesale Food Market 
 C: Lin Cheung Road
 D1: Sham Mong Road
 D2: V Walk

References 

MTR stations in Kowloon
Tung Chung line
Tuen Ma line
West Rail line
Sham Shui Po
Former Kowloon–Canton Railway stations
Railway stations in Hong Kong opened in 2003
2003 establishments in Hong Kong